Udhayan is an Indian Tamil film director, based in Chennai, India.

Personal life
His birth name is S. B. Ramadoss. Born in Perunali village at Ramanathapuram District. His elder brother Sivaram Gandhi is a dialogue writer who worked in films like Samundi (1992), Vandicholai Chinraasu (1994) and Anantha Poongatre (1999).

Career
Udhayan has directed two Tamil action films Perarasu (2006) and Aayudham Seivom (2008). Together with director Sundar C. he has written screenplays for Aranmanai, Aambala, and Aranmanai 2. He has been written dialogues for the film Ajith From Aruppukottai.

Filmography

References

External links

Film directors from Chennai
Living people
1966 births
People from Ramanathapuram district
Tamil screenwriters